Wanker is a surname. Notable people with the surname include:

Jerry Wanker, Belgian guitarist
Thomas Wanker (born 1973), Austrian composer who works on TV and film scores
Werner Wanker, Austrian curler
 The maiden name of fictional character Peggy Bundy in Married ... with Children
Arnold Wanker, fictional character from the TV series Mork & Mindy

See also
Wanker (disambiguation)
 Johanna Wanka, German politician and mathematician
Wanké